Pocharam Srinivas Reddy Parige is an Indian politician who is the current and 2nd Speaker of the Telangana Legislative Assembly from 17 January 2019 and Member of the Telangana Legislative Assembly from Banswada constituency. He was the Minister of Agriculture (2014-2019) in the government of Telangana.

Career
Reddy joined the Telugu Desam Party (TDP) in 1984 from the Indian National Congress (INC). He worked as a minister twice in TDP government. He was with TDP for 27 years before quitting.

In 1994, he contested the Banswada constituency as a TDP candidate and won with a majority of over 57,000 votes. He lost in 2004 against Bajireddy Govardhan, the INC candidate. 
In support of the Telangana Movement, he joined TRS party in March 2011. He also resigned from his MLA seat and TDP membership. He went on to contest that year's by-elections and won with a margin of over 49,000 votes against INC candidate, Sangam Srinivasgoud. He was made a Politburo member of the TRS on 24 March 2011.

In 2014 Telangana Assembly Election he was re-elected from Banswada Assembly constituency. He was inducted into Cabinet on 2 June 2014 and made Agriculture Minister of Telangana.

In Telangana Legislative Assembly election, 2018, he was re-elected from Banswada Assembly constituency. Subsequently, he was elected as the speaker of the Telangana Legislative Assembly.

Personal life
He was married to Pushpa and has 4 children, Ravinder Reddy, Surendar Reddy, Aruna and Bhasker Reddy.

References

Telangana Rashtra Samithi politicians
Telugu people
Living people
People from Nizamabad, Telangana
People from Telangana
1976 births
State cabinet ministers of Telangana
21st-century Indian politicians